Eugène Emmanuel Amaury Pineux Duval (16 April 1808 –  25 December 1885), better known by the pseudonym Amaury-Duval, was a French painter. He was one of two sons of Amaury Duval (1760–1838) and thus a nephew of the playwright Alexandre-Vincent Pineux Duval.

Life 
He was born in Montrouge. One of the first students in Jean Auguste Dominique Ingres's studio (a strong influence on all Duval's works), Duval took part in the 1829 artists' and scholars' expedition sent by Charles X of France to Greece as the Morea Expedition to produce its archaeological drawings. He first exhibited at the Paris Salon in 1833 with many portraits such as his Green Lady (no longer extant) and his Self-portrait (still to be seen in the musée des Beaux-Arts de Rennes). In 1834 he exhibited his "Greek shepherd discovering an antique bas-relief". From 1834 to 1836 he took a long Grand Tour to Florence, Rome, and Naples, where he discovered Italian Renaissance art. On returning to France he was one of the artists commissioned to decorate churches by the government of Louis-Philippe then Napoleon III – the Sainte Philomène chapel at the église Saint-Merry (1840–1844), the chapel of the virgin at Saint-Germain-l'Auxerrois in Paris (1844–1846) then the parish church of Saint-Germain-en-Laye (1849–1856). He also published his memoirs. He died in Paris on Christmas Day, 1885.

Appraisal 
Baudelaire fiercely criticised the Duval and Ingres school:

Works 
76 paintings and drawings by Duval are known, including the following:

Sources 

Dictionnaire de biographie française

References 

1808 births
1885 deaths
People from Montrouge
19th-century French painters
French male painters
19th-century French male artists